Tong Shui Road Public Pier is a public pier in Tong Shui Road, North Point, Hong Kong. It is located below Island Eastern Corridor near former North Point Estate and North Point Ferry Pier. It is usually used by government ships and boats. Many people go fishing in there. It is maintained by Civil Engineering and Development Department of the Hong Kong Government.

References

Piers in Hong Kong
North Point
Victoria Harbour